The Wonders may refer to:

The Wonders (2013 film), 2013 Israel film
The Wonders (film), 2014 Italian film
The Wonders, fictional band in That Thing You Do!